List of the published work of Gerald Stern, American poet.

Poetry
Collections
 
 Rejoicings: Selected Poems 1966-72 (Fredericton, New Brunswick, Canada: Fiddlehead Poetry Books, 1973) , 
 Lucky Life (Boston: Houghton Mifflin, 1977) , 
 The Red Coal, poetry, (Boston: Houghton Mifflin, 1981) , 
 Paradise Poems (New York: Random House, 1984) , 
 Lovesick (New York: Perennial Library, 1986) , 
 Two Long Poems (Pittsburgh: Carnegie Mellon University Press, 1990)
 Leaving Another Kingdom: Selected Poems (New York: Harper & Row, 1990) ,  – finalist for the Pulitzer Prize
 Bread without Sugar (New York: W. W. Norton, 1992) , 
 Odd Mercy (New York: W. W. Norton, 1994) , 
 This Time: New and Selected Poems (New York: W. W. Norton, 1998) ,  – winner of the National Book Award
 Last Blue (New York: W. W. Norton, 2000) , 
 American Sonnets (New York: W. W. Norton, 2002) ,  – shortlisted for the 2003 International Griffin Poetry Prize 
 Everything Is Burning (New York: W. W. Norton, 2005) , 
 Save the Last Dance: Poems (New York: W. W. Norton, 2008) , 
 Early Collected Poems, 1965-1992 (New York: W. W. Norton, 2010) , 
 In Beauty Bright (New York: W. W. Norton, 2012) , 
 Divine Nothingness, (New York: W. W. Norton & Company, 2015) , 
 Blessed As We Were: Late Selected and New Poems, 2000—2018, (New York: W. W. Norton & Company, 2020)
List of poems

Chapbooks
 Not God After All (Pittsburgh: Autumn House Press, 2004)
 The Preacher (Sarabande Books, 2007)

Collected essays
 What I Can't Bear Losing: Notes from a Life (New York: W.W. Norton, 2004)
 Selected Essays (New York: Harper & Row, 1988)
 What I Can't Bear Losing (San Antonio: Trinity University Press, 2009) 
 Stealing History (San Antonio: Trinity University Press, 2012) 
 Death Watch: A View from the Tenth Decade (San Antonio: Trinity University Press, 2017)

Critical studies and reviews of Stern's work
 The Pineys, in The Journal of the Rutgers University Library, Vol. XXXII, no. 2 (June 1969). (New Brunswick, N.J.: Associated Friends of the Rutgers University Library, 1969.) The entire issue was dedicated to this lengthy poem, Stern's first major published work.

References

Bibliographies by writer
Bibliographies of American writers